Aida Nayef Hammad Al-Sufy (born 20 May 1994) is a Jordanian footballer who plays as a forward. She has been a member of the Jordan women's national team.

International career
Al-Sufy capped for Jordan at senior level during the 2014 AFC Women's Asian Cup qualification and the 2016 AFC Women's Olympic Qualifying Tournament.

Personal life
Al-Sufy is Muslim.

References

External links

1994 births
Living people
Sportspeople from Amman
Jordanian women's footballers
Women's association football forwards
Jordan women's international footballers
Jordanian Muslims